Spring Bank, also known as Ravenscroft and Magnolia Grove, is a historic plantation house located near Lunenburg, Lunenburg County, Virginia. It was built about 1793, and is a five-part Palladian plan frame dwelling in the Late Georgian style.  It is composed of a two-story, three-bay center block flanked by one-story, one-bay, hipped roof wings with one-story, one-bay shed-roofed wings at the ends.  Also on the property are the contributing smokehouse, a log slave quarter, and frame tobacco barn, and the remains of late-18th or early-19th century dependencies, including a kitchen/laundry, ice house, spring house, and a dam. Also located on the property are a family cemetery and two other burial grounds.  It was built by John Stark Ravenscroft (1772–1830), who became the first Bishop of the Episcopal Diocese of North Carolina, serving from 1823 to 1830.

It was listed on the National Register of Historic Places in 2007.

References

Plantation houses in Virginia
Houses on the National Register of Historic Places in Virginia
Georgian architecture in Virginia
Houses completed in 1793
Houses in Lunenburg County, Virginia
National Register of Historic Places in Lunenburg County, Virginia